The Day the Music Died is the second studio album by Beneath the Sky, released on June 24, 2008.

Track listing

Personnel
 Joey Nelson – lead vocals
 Jeff Nelson – guitar
 Kevin Stafford – guitar
 Nick Scarberry – bass, vocals 
 Bryan Cash – drums

References

External links
Official Myspace Profile
Official Victory Records Page

2008 albums
Beneath the Sky albums
Victory Records albums